Gennaria is a genus of flowering plants in the orchid family, Orchidaceae. For many years it contained only one species, Gennaria diphylla. A second species, Gennaria griffithii, was added in 2015. The genus name honours Patrizio Gennari, Italian botanist and patriot.

Species
, two species are accepted:
 Gennaria diphylla  – Macaronesia, north-west Africa, south-west Europe
 Gennaria griffithii  – Afghanistan to China

See also
 List of Orchidaceae genera

References

External links 
 
 

Orchideae genera
Orchideae